Kyle Ivan Bridgwood (born 23 February 1989) is an Australian Para cyclist from South Africa. He won silver medals in the Men's Individual Pursuit C4 and Men's Road Time Trial C4 at  the 2016 Rio Paralympics.

Personal

Bridgwood was born on 23 February 1989 in South Africa. Bridgwood moved to Australia at the age of 11. He joined the Australian Army in 2007. In 2011, he was hit by a car before work. He suffered a severed patella tendon, fractured kneecap, broken back and neck. The accident led to an acquired brain injury that affects his coordination and fine-motor control. After the injury, he returned to cycling and represented the Australian Army at the 2012 United States Marines Corps Trials. He was medically discharged from the Australian army. In 2015, he studying International Studies at the University of the Sunshine Coast. He lives in Buderim, Queensland.

Cycling

He is classified as a C4 cyclist. He returned to cycling after his accident and in 2012 at the United States Marines Corps Trials he won the gold medal in the Men's 30 km Open Cycle and silver medal in basketball.

Bridgwood won the Men's Time Trial and finished second at the Men's Road Race at the 2015 Cycling Australia Para-cycling Road National Championships. At the 2015 UCI Para-cycling Road World Championships in Nottwil, Switzerland, he won the gold medal in the Men's Time Trial C4 and finished fifth in the Men's Road Race C4.

In 2015, he rode for Data#3 Symantec Team in Australian National Road Racing Series.

At the 2016 UCI Para-cycling Track World Championships in Montichiari, Italy, he won the gold medal in the Men's Scratch Race C4–5 and the silver medal in the Men's 4 km Individual Pursuit C4.

He won silver medals in the Men's Individual Pursuit C4 at  the 2016 Rio Paralympics and Men's Road Time Trial C4. He also finished in the Men's Road Race C4-5.

At the 2017 UCI Para-cycling Track World Championships in Los Angeles, United States, he won a silver medal in the Men's 4 km Individual Pursuit C4 and bronze medal in the Men's 1 km Time Trial C4.

At the 2017 UCI Para-cycling Road World Championships in Pietermaritzburg, South Africa, he won silver medals in the Men's Road Time Trial C4 and  Men's Road Race C4-5.

Bridgwood won the silver medal in the Men's 4 km Individual Pursuit C4 at the 2018 UCI Para-cycling Road World Championships, Rio de Janeiro, Brazil

He won the bronze medal in the Men's Time Trial C4 at  2018 UCI Para-cycling Road World Championships, Maniago, Italy.

Recognition
2015 - University of the Sunshine Coast Sportsperson of the Year  
2016 - University of the Sunshine Coast Sportsperson of the Year

References

External links

Kyle Bridgwood - Pro Cycling Stats

Paralympic cyclists of Australia
Cyclists at the 2016 Summer Paralympics
Medalists at the 2016 Summer Paralympics
Paralympic silver medalists for Australia
Australian male cyclists
UCI Para-cycling World Champions
1989 births
Living people
Paralympic medalists in cycling